A municipal election was held in Gatineau, Quebec, Canada on November 3, 2013 in conjunction with 2013 Quebec municipal elections across the province on that date. Elections were held for Mayor of Gatineau as well as for each of the 18 districts on Gatineau City Council.

Mayoral race

Aylmer District

Lucerne District

Deschênes District

Plateau District

Manoir-des-Trembles-Val-Tétreau District

l'Orée-du-Parc District

Parc-de-la-Montagne-Saint-Raymond District

Hull-Wright District

Limbour District

Touraine District

Pointe-Gatineau District

Carrefour-de-l'Hôpital District

Versant District

Bellevue District

Lac-Beauchamp District

la Rivière-Blanche District
 Note: Eric Bourgeau initially won by one vote (1300 to 1299), however a recount gave Jean Lessard a one-vote win over Bourgeau

Masson-Angers District

Buckingham District

References

External links

2013 Quebec municipal elections
2013